Siu-Ying Ma (1908–1978) is a former Chinese actress and Cantonese opera performer from Hong Kong. Ma is credited with over 550 films.

Early life 
On February 4, 1908, Ma was born. Ma's sister was Ma Kam-Neong.

Career 
At age 15, Ma became a Cantonese opera performer. In 1947, Ma crossed over as an actress in Hong Kong films. Ma first appeared in Madame Yang, the Imperial Concubine (aka Beauty of Beauties), a 1947 Historical drama film directed by Mok Hong-See. Ma first appeared in Cantonese opera film in Romance of the West Chamber, a 1947 Historical Drama Cantonese opera directed by Yeung Kung-Leung. Ma is known for her role as a shrew mother. Ma appeared as a mother in The Evil Mind (1947), The Guangzhou Adventure of the Fearless (1947), The Judge Goes to Pieces (1948), Award to the Husband But Not the Wife (1948), and Heaven Never Lets the Kind-Hearted Down (1954). Ma's last film was Love Cross-Road, a 1976 Drama film directed by Wong Wa-Kei. Ma is credited with over 550 films.

Filmography

Films 
This is a partial list of film.
 1947 A Wealthy Family 
 1947 Madame Yang, the Imperial Concubine (aka Beauty of Beauties)
 1947 The Evil Mind 
 1947 The Guangzhou Adventure of the Fearless 
 1947 Romance of the West Chamber 
 1948 The Judge Goes to Pieces 
 1948 Award to the Husband But Not the Wife 
 1951 Mother and Son in Grief – Matriarch Wong 
 1954 Heaven Never Lets the Kind-Hearted Down 
 1954 Spring's Flight 
 1956 Pleasure Daughter 
 1960 Fortune.
 1960 Second Spring – Mother-in-law.
 1960 The Stubborn Generations - Madam Lee.
 1964 The Greatest Love Affair on Earth 
 1967 Story of a Discharged Prisoner - Mother
 1976 Love Cross-Road

Television series 
 1977 A House is Not a Home

Personal life 
On February 9, 1978, Ma died.

References

External links 
 Siu-Ying Ma at imdb.com
 Ma Siu Ying at hkcinemagic.com
 Morning Matinee – Past Screenings – Oct 2012: Two Screen Shrews: Ma Siu-ying and Lam Mui-mui at lcsd.gov.hk

1908 births
1978 deaths
Hong Kong film actresses
Singaporean born Hong Kong artists